Ángel Talamantes Ponce (born 22 December 1917) was a Mexican politician affiliated with the Institutional Revolutionary Party. He served as Municipal President of Aguascalientes from 1972 to 1974.

See also
 List of mayors of Aguascalientes

References

Institutional Revolutionary Party politicians
Possibly living people
1917 births
People from Parral, Chihuahua
20th-century Mexican politicians
Politicians from Chihuahua (state)
Municipal presidents of Aguascalientes